Henry Ross Perot Jr. (born November 7, 1958) is a real estate developer and American businessman who is best known for his development of Alliance, Texas, an inland port near Dallas–Fort Worth, and making the first circumnavigation of the world in a helicopter at the age of 23.

Perot serves as the chairman for multiple companies including The Perot Group and Hillwood. He is the only son and eldest child of American billionaire businessman and former United States presidential candidate Ross Perot.

Early life
Perot was born and raised in Dallas, the son of Margot (née Birmingham) and Ross Perot. He graduated from St. Mark's School of Texas in 1977. After graduating from Vanderbilt University, he served in the United States Air Force for eight and a half years.

Career
In 1982, Perot co-piloted the first flight by helicopter around the world. Using a Bell 206 L-1 Long Ranger II, Perot completed the circumnavigation on September 30, 1982.

Perot serves as chairman of The Perot Group, which manages the various Perot family interests that include real estate, oil and gas, and financial investments. He developed the Fort Worth Alliance Airport and is a large real estate developer. Hillwood's residential division, is building Harvest, a $1 billion, 1,150-acre development in Northlake and Argyle. Hillwood Communities recently kicked off developments including the 1006.5 acres development Pomona in Manvel, TX and the 787-acre Union Park in Little Elm.

From 2002 to 2003, Perot served as chairman of the Texas Governor's Task Force for Economic Growth. In March 2007, presidential candidate Mitt Romney, seeking the Republican Party nomination selected Perot as a member of his Texas finance committee.

Perot was a member of the Board of Directors for Dell Inc. Perot is a board member of Guide IT. He is Chairman of the United States Air Force Memorial Foundation and Co-Chairman of the EastWest Institute. He also sits on the Board of Trustees of St. Mark's School of Texas, Southern Methodist University, and Vanderbilt University. In 2010 Forbes reported Perot's net worth at $1.5 Billion. Perot was the 1983 recipient of the Langley Gold Medal from the Smithsonian Institution..

In April 2020, Governor Greg Abbott named Perot to the Strike Force to Open Texas – a group "tasked with finding safe and effective ways to slowly reopen the state" amid the COVID-19 pandemic.

Dallas Mavericks ownership
Perot purchased the Dallas Mavericks NBA basketball team from original owner Don Carter in March 1996. Under his four-year tenure, the Mavericks made no more progress on the court than they had in Carter's final seasons, and nowhere near what they would do under his successor, Mark Cuban. It was said that he was a basketball novice, or disinterested in the sport and was using his position as team owner to front his projects, most notably Victory Park, which was anchored by the American Airlines Center which opened in 2001. He sold the team to Cuban in January 2000 and the franchise did not have a losing season in any of the subsequent fifteen seasons, winning two Western Conference championships and the 2011 NBA championship.

In May 2010, Perot, who retained 5 percent ownership, filed a lawsuit against Cuban, alleging the franchise was insolvent or in imminent danger of insolvency. In June 2010, Cuban responded in a court filing maintaining Perot is wrongly seeking money to offset some $100 million in losses on the Victory Park real estate development. The lawsuit was dismissed in 2011, due in part to Cuban asserting proper management of the team due to its recent victory in the 2011 NBA Finals. In 2014, the 5th Circuit Court affirmed that decision on appeal. Following his initial defeat, Perot attempted to shut out Mavericks fans from use of the parking lots he controlled near the American Airlines Center. Perot retains a minority stake in the team, as does his predecessor Carter's estate.

Honors 
 In 1982, President Ronald Reagan presented Perot with the Gold Medal Award for Extraordinary Service.
 In 1983, Perot was the recipient of the Golden Plate Award of the American Academy of Achievement.
 In 2007, Perot was the recipient of the Woodrow Wilson Award for Corporate Citizenship. 
 In 2007, Perot was the recipient of the Secretary of Defense Medal for Outstanding Public Service.
 In 2008, Perot and his father, H. Ross Perot, jointly received the H. Neil Mallon Award presented by the World Affairs Council - Dallas/Fort Worth.
 In 2012, Perot was inducted into the Texas Transportation Hall of Honor.
 In 2019, National Business Aviation Association (NBAA) bestowed its 2019 Meritorious Service to Aviation Award to Perot.
 In 2022, the National Eagle Scout Association awarded him the Distinguished Eagle Scout Award.

See also
Notable alumni of St. Mark's School of Texas

References

External links
 Bio at AllianceTexas.com
 Bio at GuideIT.com
 

1958 births
Living people
Businesspeople from Dallas
Military personnel from Texas
Perot, Ross Jr.
St. Mark's School (Texas) alumni
Vanderbilt University alumni
United States Air Force officers
Southern Methodist University people
American billionaires
Texas Republicans
Dallas Mavericks owners